Billiard or billiards may refer to:

Games
 A , a type of shot in cue sports (see below)
 Billiards: cue sports in general; the term "billiards" by itself is also sometimes used to refer to any of the following more specifically:
 Carom billiards (also known as French billiards), games in general (a chiefly non-British usage)
 Three-cushion billiards, even more specifically, the most popular form of carom billiards worldwide
 The specific game of English billiards (a chiefly British, Irish and Australian usage)
 Pool (cue sports) (pocket billiards) games, such as eight-ball and nine-ball, in general (a chiefly colloquial North American usage)
 See the list of cue sports for various other games with "billiards" in their names; also more specifically:
 Pin billiards, a fairly large number of billiard games that use a pin, or a set of "pins", or "skittles"
 Bar billiards, a game combining elements of bagatelle and English billiards
 Electric billiards, an obsolete term for pinball (from  électrique in French, in which pinball is today called flipper, a borrowing from English)

Mathematics and physics
 Billiard (number), the long-scale name used in most European languages for the number 1015 (called quadrillion in the short scale generally used in English)
 Dynamical billiards, the mathematical theory of particle trajectories within a closed reflective boundary

People
 Harry Billiard (1883–1923), Major League Baseball pitcher
 Maria Duchêne-Billiard (1884–?), French contralto of the Metropolitan Opera
  (née Billiard, 1884–1976), American painter, and wife of Robert Pelton Sibley
 Efren Reyes Philippine Professional Billiard Player

See also
 Billiards World Cup Association, a governing body for carom billiards
 Billard, a French rolling stock construction company
 Bobbi Billard (born 1975), American model